"The Hunter Gets Captured by the Game" is a 1966 song written by Smokey Robinson. It was a hit single in 1967 for the American girl group The Marvelettes for the Motown label, from their self-titled album released that same year. In 1980, Jamaican singer Grace Jones remade the song and had minor success with her version in the US.

The song has had several cover versions over the years. Blondie included a cover as the closing track on their 1982 conceptual album The Hunter. Massive Attack and Tracey Thorn (of Everything but the Girl) recorded a cover for the soundtrack to Batman Forever in 1995. Most recently, Bette Midler performed a rendition included in the deluxe edition of her 2014 studio album It's The Girls!. Another cover also appeared on Jerry Garcia's Compliments in 1974 and was performed live by the Jerry Garcia Band until into the early 90s.

The Marvelettes version

Background
The Marvelettes single peaked in the United States in spring 1967 at number 13 on the Billboard Hot 100 pop singles chart and at number two on the Billboard soul chart. The group's version of the song was produced by Smokey Robinson. The song is written in the first person, from the point of view of someone who has "laid such a tender trap" to catch a lover. Lead singer Wanda Young-Rogers (wife of Miracles member Bobby Rogers) talks about how she had been stalking her lover, having to learn his "ways and habits" so she could plan how to catch him. But "certain things rearrange" and she finds herself caught, presumably, in love with her 'game.'

There seems to be 3 variations issued. The original mono single ended cold, yet some (not all) of the stereo remixes fade at the end. There is also a different last verse on some of the reissues, leading to the assumption that Smokey recorded the song much longer than any of the issued versions. Additionally, the single version and at least one of the stereo mixes exclude the first part of the second verse.

Billboard named the song #71 on their list of 100 Greatest Girl Group Songs of All Time.

Personnel
Lead vocals by Wanda Young-Rogers
Background vocals by The Andantes: Jackie Hicks, Marlene Barrow, and Louvain Demps
Instrumentation by The Funk Brothers

Chart performance

Grace Jones version

Background
Jamaican singer Grace Jones covered "The Hunter Gets Captured by the Game" on Warm Leatherette in 1980, her first post-disco album. It was also released as the lead single in the USA and the fourth in the UK. The B-side on the European single is an alternate version of the song, known as the "Special Single Version". This version was not released on CD until 2016 when Warm Leatherette was reissued.

Track listings
US 7" single
A. "The Hunter Gets Captured by the Game" – 3:49
B. "Sinning" – 5:06

EU 7" single
A. "The Hunter Gets Captured by the Game" (LP version) – 3:50
B. "The Hunter Gets Captured by the Game" (Special Version) – 3:20

UK 12" single
A. "The Hunter Gets Captured by the Game" (long version) – 6:43
B. "Warm Leatherette" (long version) – 5:36

Chart performance

References

1967 singles
1980 singles
Batman (1989 film series)
Batman music
Grace Jones songs
The Miracles songs
The Marvelettes songs
Songs written by Smokey Robinson
Tamla Records singles
1966 songs
Song recordings produced by Smokey Robinson
Song recordings produced by Alex Sadkin